Dimitri "Jimmy" Toumpas (born 2 January 1994) is a former professional Australian rules footballer best known for his time at the Melbourne Football Club where he played 27 games from 2013 to 2015.

He was drafted by Melbourne with the fourth selection in the 2012 AFL draft, after playing for Woodville-West Torrens in the South Australian National Football League (SANFL). He made his SANFL senior debut late in the 2011 season and he played in Woodville West-Torrens' 2011 premiership side in only his fifth game. He was the captain of the South Australian team at the 2012 AFL Under 18 Championships and was named in the All-Australian team at the conclusion of the tournament.

In August 2018 he was delisted by Port Adelaide Football Club without having played an AFL game in 2018.

Statistics
 Statistics are correct to the end of the 2016 season

|- style="background-color: #EAEAEA"
! scope="row" style="text-align:center" | 2013
|  || 5 || 14 || 0 || 3 || 93 || 75 || 168 || 43 || 35 || 0.0 || 0.2 || 6.6 || 5.4 || 12.0 || 3.1 || 2.5
|- 
! scope="row" style="text-align:center" | 2014
|  || 5 || 4 || 2 || 1 || 38 || 18 || 56 || 21 || 7 || 0.5 || 0.3 || 9.5 || 4.5 || 14.0 || 5.3 || 1.8
|- style="background-color: #EAEAEA"
! scope="row" style="text-align:center" | 2015
|  || 5 || 9 || 4 || 0 || 59 || 76 || 135 || 27 || 28 || 0.4 || 0.0 || 6.6 || 8.4 || 15.0 || 3.0 || 3.1
|- 
! scope="row" style="text-align:center" | 2016
|  || 18 || 8 || 1 || 2 || 64 || 69 || 133 || 22 || 26 || 0.1 || 0.3 || 8.0 || 8.6 || 16.6 || 2.8 || 3.3
|- class="sortbottom"
! colspan=3| Career
! 35
! 7
! 6
! 254
! 238
! 492
! 113
! 96
! 0.2
! 0.2
! 7.3
! 6.8
! 14.1
! 3.2
! 2.7
|}

References

External links

Living people
1994 births
Australian rules footballers from South Australia
Woodville-West Torrens Football Club players
Melbourne Football Club players
Casey Demons players
Australian people of Greek descent
Port Adelaide Football Club players
Port Adelaide Football Club players (all competitions)